Karimunjawa National Park, also Crimon Java National Park, is a national marine park designated in the Karimun Java archipelago, Jepara Regency, Central Java, Indonesia. It lies 80 km north west of Jepara, Central Java in the Java Sea. The national park was formally declared as Marine Protection Area in 2001. Based on popular local myth, this archipelago was discovered by Sunan Nyamplungan, the nephew of Sunan Kudus who is one of the Wali Sanga.

Karimun Java is also a tourist attraction popular for its white sandy beach, pristine coral reefs, challenging treks through the hills, the pilgrimage to Sunan Nyamplungan Cemetery, and the customs and traditions of the Karimunjava community.

History
Following a local legend, Karimun means not obvious, because in clear weather Karimunjawa can be seen from the coast of mainland Java, but still not clearly. Karimunjawa was originally settled by Sunan Nyamplungan, the son of Sunan Muria, one of the Muslim Saints (Sunan) who introduced Islam to Java.

Karimunjawa is more famous than Bali (who was only a base for pirates for long) since centuries ... The island have been known by navigators worldwide as a haven on the trade roads through the java sea to Borneo or Spices Islands and can be found under different names (Tortuga, Chirimao, Carimon jawa ...) on all Antique portulans and maps of the area.

Historical Sources relate the discovery of the Archipelago by Chinese Army sent by emperor Kubhilai Khan in 1293 (they named it CHI-LI-MEN), followed by Ottoman Turkish navigators in 1403, Portuguese, Dutch, French (Bouguinville ...), English etc ... Recent Archeological researches found porcelains from the Ming dynasty.

Many Yachtmen continue the tradition and stop now in Karimunjawa on their way from Australia to Thailand or China sea or back ...

Geography
The Crimon Java archipelago lies from 5°49’ - 5°57’ South Latitude and 110°04' - 110°40' East Longitude in the Java Sea, north of Java. It is about 120 km from Semarang, the capital of Central Java Province; and about 80 km from the nearest town Jepara. Comprising 27 islands, the Karimunjawa subdistrict is divided into three villages, namely Karimunjawa, Kemujan and Parang. The archipelago is under the administration of Jepara Regency, Central Java Province.

The geological formation in the archipelago is mostly dominated by quartz sandstone, gravel, mud, and clay. The topography of Karimunjawa Marine National Park is a wave of low land, with elevation ranging from 0–506 meters above sea level. Gajah hill is the Park’s highest point. Temperatures range from 30-31 °C.

The biggest island in the archipelago is Karimunjawa Island. Towns or villages are located in Karimunjava, Kemujan, Nyamuk, Parang, and Genting Island. The other islands are uninhabited.

Ecosystem
Many researchers have been attracted to the marine biodiversity and pristine forest as well as the uniqueness of the Karimunjawa archipelago. During the Dutch colonial era, many Dutch botanists such as Teijsmann (1854), Koorders (1886), Schlechter (1910) and Dammerman (1926) came to the Karimunjawa archipelago.

Karimunjawa has five types of ecosystems: coral reef, seagrass and seaweed, mangrove forest, coastal forest and low land tropical rainforest. Fresh water is confined to a few small wells and forest streams in the islands.

The coral reefs
Karimunjawa's coral reefs are made up of fringing reefs, barrier reefs and several patch reefs. They have an extraordinary wealth of species: 51 genera with more than 90 species of coral biota and 242 species of ornamental fish. Two protected biota species, black coral (Antiphates sp.) and organ pipe coral (Tubipora musica), can be found here. Other protected sea biota include the hornet helmet (Cassis cornuta), triton trumpet (Charonia tritonis), chambered nautilus, green shell (Turbo marmoratus), and six species of clam. Around Kemujan island, the wreck of the Panamanian ship Indono, which sank to the sea bed in 1955, is now a habitat of coral fish and is a popular site for wreck diving.

The seagrasses and seaweeds
There are 10 genera of seagrass mostly dominated by Enhalus and Thalassia. The seaweed species are grouped into three divisions:
Chlorophyta (Coulerpa and Halimeda), Phaeophyta (Padina, Sargassum and Turbinaria) and Rhodophyta (Euchema, Glacillaria, Gelidinium, Hypne and Acanthopora).

The forests
 
A total of 300 ha of mangrove forest covers the national park, and is the habitat for 13 genera and 32 species of mangroves, such as the Rhizophora mucronata.

The lowland tropical forest covers an area of 1,285.50 ha. It provides habitat to a number of endemic species including the mythical dewadaru tree (Fagraea elliptica), setigi (Pemphis acidula) and kalimasada (Cordia subcordata). The local people use these trees as raw material for souvenir handicrafts such as tasbih, kris, or staffs. It is generally believed that the wood of the endemic dewadaru tree has a legendary power of curing diseases or snake bite wounds, protecting house from thieves, or prolonging life. Recently, the population of these three tree species has deteriorated because of the increased extraction.

There are about forty different bird species in the island, including the green imperial-pigeon, (Ducula aenea), yellow-vented bulbul (Pycnonotus goiavier) and red-breasted parakeet (Psittacula alexandri). Some migratory birds are also found in this area, such as the common sandpiper and whimbrel. The lowland tropical rain forest is the natural habitat of the rare white-bellied sea eagle. The latest expedition report of the Indonesian Science Institute reveals that there are two endemic butterfly species, and these are the Euploea crameri karimodjawensis and the Idea leuconoe karimodjawensis.

The diversity of terrestrial animals of this park is not as high in terms of numbers as that of the aquatic animals. However, it is still possible to see Javan rusa deer (Cervus timorensis), Sunda pangolin (Manis javanica), and the Malayan pit viper (Calloselasma rhodostoma).

Several species of turtles lay their eggs on the islands, e.g. hawksbill turtle and green turtle.

Conservation
Karimunjawa Marine National Park is one of the six marine national parks in Indonesia, and was among the first areas recognised as being important for conservation and marine biodiversity protection. It was formally declared a Strict Natural Reserve in 1986 and has since been declared one of the priority areas for the conservation of marine biodiversity in Southeast Asia. Then in 1999, the Ministry of Forestry established Karimunjawa archipelago as the Karimunjawa Marine National Park covering 111,625 ha. In 2001, an area of 110,117.30 ha was declared as Marine Protection Area (MPA).

Based on the functions, Karimunjawa National Park was divided into four zones:
Sanctuary Zone (1,299 ha): A no-take zone consisting of Burung and Geleang Islands. Research and education is permitted.
Wilderness Zone (7,801 ha): Research is permitted and tourist activity is limited. It consists of Krakal Besar, Krakal Kecil, Menyawakan, Cemara Besar, Cemara Kecil, Bengkoang and part of Karimunjawa and Kemujan islands.
Utilization Zone (4,431 ha): Consists Menjangan Besar, Menjangan Kecil, Kembang, Kembar, Karang Katang, Karang Kapal, Parang, Karimunjawa and Kemujan.
Buffer Zone (98,093.5 ha): Comprises Karimunjawa, Kemujan, Parang, and Nyamuk. These islands are inhabited.

Due to the dynamic process of management, recent degradation and the degree of destruction, the current zones are no longer effective for management. The Karimunjawa National Park is now proposing a new zone management through a project that began in 2002 and is still ongoing.

People
The population of Karimunjawa District is 8,842, most of whom are fishermen. Karimunjawa community consists of many ethnic groups such as Javanese, Madurese, Bugis, Mandar, Bajak, and Luwu. The Javanese people are popularly known for their agricultural activity and their production of household utensils. The Bugis are known for their seafaring activities, and naturally they are associated with fishermen. The Madurese are known for their salted fish production. They live in harmony and have created a new behaviour and tradition.

Culture and legends
The legend of Karimunjava is related to Sunan Nyamplungan story. Sunan Nyamplungan was born Amir Hasan, the son of Sunan Muria, one of the Wali Sanga. He was very spoiled by his mother, and is a disobedient child. By his father, he was entrusted to his uncle, Sunan Kudus. After some time being under Sunan Kudus's upbringing, he became an obedient young man. He was sent back to his parent, only to turn into a disobedient person again. Furious of his constant disobedience, Sunan Muria strove to inculcate in him a certain hard lesson. So one day Sunan Muria drove his son away from home with the warning that he was not to set foot on Java again.

Not willing to disobey his father again, he prepared himself for the journey. In sadness, the son left Mount Muria where they dwelt and moved on to the open seas to the north. He sailed on a boat for many days through stormy weather and amidst huge waves, not really knowing his destination and perhaps with little will to survive. Then one day, his boat landed on the shores of a small, uninhabited island. 
Meanwhile, from the peak of Mount Muria in Java, the boy's father was secretly watching over his son clairvoyantly. But for some reason his vision was vague and unclear, and thus lost track of the whereabouts of the boy on that island. In the old Javanese language, the word "vague" is translated as kerimun. Thus the island became known as "Karimun-java."

The boy continued his journey inland bearing two wooden staffs as walking sticks to assist his journey. He retrieved these from the shore. These two short poles wounded him while his boat was capsized to shore by the sheer power of the waves. In the middle of the forest he poked the two staffs to the ground and started to rest from the tiresome journey. Miraculously, in that very instant the two staffs grew into magnificent trees. In awe of the incident, he named them "Dewadaru" (also known as Nyamplung tree). In the present day, the place where he rested now stands the village of Nyamplungan.

In other version of the story, Amir Hasan was accompanied by two guards and two seeds of Nyamplung fruit with him during his journey. He also brought a mustaka (part of the top of mosque) which is now still residing in complex of Sunan Nyamplungan grave. The place where Amir Hasan resided was crowded with Nyamplung tree. The Dewadaru or Nyamplung tree is still regarded as sacred in the Karimunjawa archipelago.

There are numerous strange stories related to the magical Dewadaru tree or its wood. To the local inhabitants these are no longer a matter of belief but knowledge and conviction gained from day to day experience. Being sacred, the Dewadaru is used only for devotional and protective purposes. One hardly finds the villagers using this wood for the fashioning of furniture or as a building material; and only the courageous would use it in their spiritual activities. The trees are not too numerous on the islands nowadays and therefore they are forcefully preserved. The Dewadaru is esteemed highly for their traditional and cultural value, and regarded as the totem guardians of the island. Because the occult power of the Dewadaru is well known, many disrespectful outsiders plunder the wood seeking to possess and misuse the power within it for egoic purposes. But it is also believed that Sunan Nyamplungan, the guardian of the island, or his proxy, plays a role in protecting the place from pilferers. Some say that the Adept sometimes appear as a gigantic bat to those who carry-out their negative intentions.

In 1992, the faculty of biology of the University of Gajah Mada conducted some research on the Dewadaru and the report of their analysis states that this tree is quite rare and not easily propagated. There are two species to be found in the Karimunjava islands: the first is Baccaurea sumatrana from the family Euphorbiaceae; the second is Fagraea elliptica from the family Loganiaceae.

The Dewadaru is supposed to be found solely in the Karimunjava islands. Although almost unheard of, there is at least one Dewadaru tree to be found in Java in the area of Mt. Kawi in the region of Malang, East Java. Strangely enough, those living in this area sanctify the leaves rather than the wood.

Tourism
The archipelago is accessible via flights from Surabaya to Dewandaru Airport in Kemujan Island. There is also a regular ferry and fast boat between Jepara or Kendal (near Semarang) ports to Karimunjawa island.

Menjangan Kecil, Menjangan Besar, Tanjung Gelam, Legon Lele, Genting, Kembar, Parang, Cemara and Krakal Islands are popular marine tourism destinations (sailing, surfing, water skiing, swimming, white sand beaches, diving), camping, cultural visits, deer and bird observation. The Bengkoang and Kemujan Islands are a camping site and a site for the Panamanian ship Indono wreck diving. The hills of Bukit Bendera, Bukit Gajah and Legon Goprak are used as tracking and marine tours.

There are many homestays or guests houses in Karimunjawa. There is one Boutique resort close to the village and a luxury resort on its own island.

See also 
 List of national parks of Indonesia
 Geography of Indonesia

References

External links 

 ASEAN Regional Centre for Biodiversity Conservation: Karimunjawa Marine National Park Profile
 Ministry of Forestry: Karimunjawa National Park
 

Tourism in Jepara
Geography of Central Java
National parks of Indonesia
Protected areas established in 1986
1986 establishments in Indonesia
Tourist attractions in Central Java